Adrienne Johnson (born February 5, 1974) is a former professional basketball player who spent eight seasons in the WNBA.

College
Johnson compiled over 1000 total points and averaged 13.0 points and 3.1 assists her senior year.

WNBA
She compiled 1018 points, 292 rebounds, and 132 assists in her eight seasons. She retired in 2005.

Jobs after playing career

University of Louisville
Women's basketball program's executive director for player relations
Athletic department's outreach coordinator (six years)
Analyst for the Louisville women's basketball radio broadcasts

Awards and honors

College
All-Big Ten honors (1996)

WNBA
WNBA's first Hometown Hero Award (2000)

Personal life
Johnson earned a  bachelor's degree in exercise physiology from Ohio State University.

References

External links

 

1974 births
Living people
Basketball players from Louisville, Kentucky
African-American basketball players
Orlando Miracle players
Connecticut Sun players
University of Louisville faculty
Cleveland Rockers players
Ohio State Buckeyes women's basketball players
Butler High School alumni
American women's basketball players
Guards (basketball)
American women academics
21st-century African-American sportspeople
21st-century African-American women
20th-century African-American sportspeople
20th-century African-American women
20th-century African-American people